NGC 7773 is a barred spiral galaxy located in the constellation of Pegasus at an approximate distance of 400 million light years. NGC 7773 was discovered on October 9, 1790 by William Herschel.

See also
Galaxy

Gallery

References

External links

NGC 7773 on SIMBAD

7773
Pegasus (constellation)
Barred spiral galaxies